Comamonas granuli is a Gram-negative, catalase-positive, oxidase-positive, non-spore-forming, motile, rod-shaped bacterium from the genus Comamonas and family Comamonadaceae, which was isolated from microbial granules.

References

External links
Type strain of Comamonas granuli at BacDive -  the Bacterial Diversity Metadatabase

Comamonadaceae
Bacteria described in 2011